Gene orders are the permutation of genome arrangement. A fair amount of research has been done trying to determine whether gene orders evolve according to a molecular clock (molecular clock hypothesis) or in jumps (punctuated equilibrium).

Some research on gene orders in animals' mitochondrial genomes reveal that the mutation rate of gene orders is not a constant in some degrees.

References

Genetics